State Route 74 (SR 74) is a  state highway that runs southeast-to-northwest through portions of Bibb, Monroe, Upson, Pike, Meriwether, Coweta, Fayette, and Fulton counties in the central part of the U.S. state of Georgia. The route connects the Macon and Fairburn, via Thomaston, Woodbury, and Peachtree City.

Route description
SR 74 begins at an interchange with Interstate 75 (I-75) and SR 540 in the Unionville neighborhood of Macon, in Bibb County. This interchange is at the southwestern edge of Mercer University. Just over  later, it intersects US 41/SR 247 (Pio Nono Avenue). It curves to the southwest, passing Macon Mall. It heads west-northwest, passing Macon Memorial Park Cemetery, before an interchange with I-475. It passes just north of Lake Tobesofkee and the Tobesofkee Recreation Area, before crossing into Monroe County. The highway gradually zigzags its way to an intersection with SR 42. It continues to the west and intersects US 341/SR 7 (Peach Blossom Trail), just north-northeast of Culloden. Then, it heads northwest into Upson County. It curves into Yatesville. It heads west-northwest and curves to the southwest, to enter Thomaston. In town, the highway begins a concurrency with SR 36 (Barnesville Highway). They intersect US 19/SR 3. At the next block, SR 36/SR 74 turn to the left onto South Green Street, while SR 74 Alternate (West Main Street) begins straight ahead. One more block later, SR 74 splits off to the west onto West Gordon Street. It curves to the northwest and meets the western terminus of SR 74 Alternate just before leaving town. It continues to the northwest, then curves to the southwest, before heading northwest again. The highway continues to the northwest, through rural areas of the county and crosses the southwestern corner of Pike County. South-southwest of Molena, SR 18/SR 109 begin a concurrency to the west. The three highways head west-southwest and Flint River into Meriwether County. They enter Woodbury. There, at the intersection with SR 85, SR 74 splits off to the north, running concurrent with SR 85. A short distance later, they meet the northern terminus of SR 85 Alternate (Whitehouse Parkway). Farther to the north-northwest, in Gay, is the eastern terminus of SR 109 Spur (Greenville Street). In the unincorporated community of Alps, they intersect SR 362, which briefly joins the concurrency. Less than  later, they reach the Meriwether–Coweta county line. The concurrent highways pass through Haralson and enter the southeast part of Senoia. There, they intersect with SR 16 (Wells Street). Less than  later, they cross over Line Creek, into Fayette County. They enter Starrs Mill, where SR 74 departs to the northwest. Almost immediately, it enters Peachtree City. The highway passes by the Atlanta Regional Airport. Farther to the north-northwest, it intersects SR 54. SR 74 passes through Tyrone and enters Fulton County. Just under  later, it meets an interchange with I-85 in Fairburn. The highway curves to the northwest and runs underneath a bridge that carries US 29/SR 14 (Roosevelt Highway). At the ramp that leads to US 29/SR 14, SR 74 takes the ramp and ends at Roosevelt Highway.

The only portion of SR 74 that is part of the National Highway System, a system of routes determined to be the most important for the nation's economy, mobility, and defense, is from SR 54 in Peachtree City to its northern terminus.

Major intersections

Bannered route

State Route 74 Alternate (SR 74 Alt.) is a  alternate route that exists entirely within the central part of Upson County. Its route is completely within the city limits of Thomaston.

It begins at an intersection with the SR 74 mainline (West Gordon Street) in the far western part of Thomaston. It heads east-southeast and gradually curves to the southeast. It then curves back to the east. It meets its eastern terminus, an intersection with Green Street, one block north of SR 36/SR 74, in the main part of town. Here, the roadway continues as West Main Street.

See also

References

External links
 

 Georgia Roads (Routes 61 - 80)

074
Transportation in Macon, Georgia
Transportation in Bibb County, Georgia
Transportation in Monroe County, Georgia
Transportation in Upson County, Georgia
Transportation in Pike County, Georgia
Transportation in Meriwether County, Georgia
Transportation in Coweta County, Georgia
Transportation in Fayette County, Georgia
Transportation in Fulton County, Georgia